A by-election was held for the New South Wales Legislative Assembly electorate of Tenterfield on 14 September 1904 because Charles Lee had been appointed Secretary for Public Works in the Carruthers ministry. Until 1907, members appointed to a ministerial position were required to face a by-election. These were generally uncontested. On this occasion a poll was required in Bingara (Samuel Moore), Glebe (James Hogue) and Tenterfield and all were comfortably re-elected. The four other ministers, Joseph Carruthers (St George), James Ashton (Goulburn), Broughton O'Conor (Sherbrooke) and Charles Wade (Gordon), were re-elected unopposed.

Robert Pyers was the former member for The Richmond which had been partly absorbed by Tenterfield for the August 1904 election and Pyers had been defeated by Lee.

Dates

Result

Charles Lee was appointed Secretary for Public Works in the Carruthers ministry.

See also
Electoral results for the district of Tenterfield

Notes

References

1904 elections in Australia
New South Wales state by-elections
1900s in New South Wales